VFW is an initialism for Veterans of Foreign Wars, a U.S. war veterans' organization.

VFW may also refer to:

Vancouver Fashion Week, British Columbia, Canada
Vereinigte Flugtechnische Werke, a former German aerospace manufacturer
VFW-Fokker GmbH, a joint venture of Fokker and Vereinigte Flugtechnische Werke
Veterans of Foreign Wars Parkway (VFW Parkway)
Veterans of Future Wars
VFW (film), a 2019 thriller film by Joe Begos
VFW Club, a historic building in Hamilton, Montana, list on the U.S. National Register of Historic Places
Video for Windows